Peter Gansevoort (December 22, 1788  – January 4, 1876) was an American politician from New York.

Early life
Peter Gansevoort was the son of Gen. Peter Gansevoort (1749–1812) and Catherine (née Van Schaick) Gansevoort. Leonard Gansevoort (1751–1810) was his uncle, and author Herman Melville (1819–1891) and Commodore Guert Gansevoort (1812–1868) were his nephews.

He attended Williams College from 1804 to 1805, graduated B.A. from the College of New Jersey in 1808.  He studied law with Harmanus Bleecker, attended Litchfield Law School from 1808 to 1809, graduated M.A. from the College of New Jersey in 1811, was admitted to the bar in 1811, and practiced in Albany.

Career
From 1817 to 1819, he was the private secretary of Gov. DeWitt Clinton. From 1819 to 1821, he served as the Judge Advocate General of the New York State Militia.

He was a member of the New York State Assembly (Albany Co.) in 1830 and 1831.

Gansevoort was a member of the New York State Senate (3rd D.) from 1833 to 1836, sitting in the 56th, 57th, 58th and 59th New York State Legislatures.

From 1843 to 1847, he was First Judge of the Albany County Court.

He was a director of the New York State Bank from about 1832 until his death; and a trustee of The Albany Academy from 1826 until his death, and Chairman of the Board of Trustees from 1856.

Personal life
In 1833, he married Mary Sanford (1814–1841), a daughter of Chancellor Nathan Sandford, and they had four children, two of whom died in infancy, leaving two who survived into adulthood:

 Henry Sanford Gansevoort (1835–1871), a Union Army General
 Catherine Gansevoort, who married State Senator Abraham Lansing (a nephew of her stepmother) in 1873

After the death of his wife in 1841, he married Susan Lansing (1804–1874) in December 1843.

He died on January 4, 1876, and was buried at the Albany Rural Cemetery in Menands, New York.

References

Sources
The New York Civil List compiled by Franklin Benjamin Hough (pages 129ff, 141, 209f, 275 and 358; Weed, Parsons and Co., 1858)
A Herman Melville Encyclopedia by Robert L. Gale (Greenwood Press, Westport CT, 1995; ; the Gansevoorts, pg. 149 to 159)

External links

19th-century American politicians
1788 births
1876 deaths
Burials at Albany Rural Cemetery
Peter 1788
Lawyers from Albany, New York
Litchfield Law School alumni
Members of the New York State Assembly
New York (state) Jacksonians
New York (state) state senators
New York (state) state court judges
Politicians from Albany, New York
Princeton University alumni
Peter Gansevoort
Lansing family